"Too Much" is a song by American rock group Dave Matthews Band. It was released in April 1996 as the lead single off their album Crash, and reached #5 on the Billboard magazine Modern Rock Tracks chart. It is also featured on the Dave Matthews Band compilation album The Best of What's Around Vol. 1.

Track listing

U.S. single
"Too Much" (Album Version) — 4:20
"Too Much" (Edit) — 3:45

International single 1
"Too Much" (Edit) — 3:45
"Too Much" (Album Version) — 4:20
"Jimi Thing" (Live at Luther College) — 7:49

International single 2
"Too Much" (Edit) — 3:45
"Ants Marching" (Album Version) — 4:31
"Jimi Thing" (Acoustic) — 7:49

Charts

References

Dave Matthews Band songs
1996 singles
Songs written by Dave Matthews
Songs written by Carter Beauford
Songs written by Stefan Lessard
Songs written by LeRoi Moore
Songs written by Boyd Tinsley
Song recordings produced by Steve Lillywhite
1996 songs
RCA Records singles